Robert Stanjek (born 7 May 1981 in Rüdersdorf, Brandenburg) is a German sailor, who specialized in two-person keelboat (Star) class. He represented Germany, along with his partner Frithjof Kleen in the Star class at the 2012 Summer Olympics, and also captured a silver medal at the 2011 ISAF Sailing World Championships in Perth, Australia. Stanjek has also been training throughout most of his sporting career for the North German Sailing Regatta in Hamburg under his personal coach Alan Smith. As of November 2014, Stanjek is ranked eighth in the world for the two-person keelboat by the International Sailing Federation, following his first-place effort at the ISAF World Cup Series and Star World Championships in Malcesine, Italy.

Stanjek qualified as a skipper for the German squad in the Star class at the 2012 Summer Olympics in London by placing second and receiving a berth from the ISAF World Championships in Perth, Western Australia. Teaming with his partner Frithjof Kleen in the opening series, the German duo recorded a net score of 70 points throughout the entire race, but came up short for the medal podium in sixth position against a fleet of sixteen boats.

References

External links
 
 
 
 
 
  

1981 births
Living people
German male sailors (sport)
Olympic sailors of Germany
Sailors at the 2012 Summer Olympics – Star
People from Rüdersdorf
Sportspeople from Brandenburg
Norddeutscher Regatta Verein sailors
Star class world champions
World champions in sailing for Germany
20th-century German people
21st-century German people